The 1939 World Table Tennis Championships women's doubles was the 12th edition of the women's doubles championship.
Gertrude Pritzi and Hilde Bussmann defeated Sári Kolosvari and Angelica Adelstein in the final by three sets to nil. 

After the annexation of Austria by Germany, the Austrian Pritzi had to participate under the Nazi Germany flag.

Results

See also
List of World Table Tennis Championships medalists

References

-
-